This gallery of head of government standards shows the flag, seal or standard of prime minister or governmental body of world countries.



A

B

C

D

F

G

H

I

J

L

M

P

R

S

T

U

See also
 Gallery of head of state standards

Notes

Standards (flags)
Image galleries